The Federation of Analytical Chemistry and Spectroscopy Societies or FACSS  is a scientific society incorporated on June 28, 1972, with the goal of promoting research and education in analytical chemistry.  The organization combined the many smaller meetings of the individual societies into an annual meeting that includes all of analytical chemistry. The meetings are intended to provide a forum for scientists to address the development of analytical chemistry, chromatography, and spectroscopy.

The society's main activity is its annual conference held every fall.  These conference offer plenary sessions, workshops, job fairs, oral presentations, poster presentations, and conference networking events.  The conference was held internationally for the first time in 1999 when it was hosted in Vancouver, BC.  The annual conference is often discussed in the journal Applied Spectroscopy, Spectroscopy Magazine, and American Pharmaceutical Reviews.

At the 2011 FACSS Conference in Reno, NV, the FACSS organization changed the name of the annual conference to SciX. The first SciX Conference presented by FACSS was held in Kansas City, MO in 2012. The name change was discussed in Spectroscopy in fall 2011: 

. More information about the new name can be found at scixconference.org

Awards 
FACSS presents several awards to both students and professionals.  These awards honor scientists who have made significant contributions to the field of Analytical Chemistry.
FACSS Student Award and Tomas A. Hirshfeld Award [3]
SAS Student Poster Awards and FACSS Student Poster Awards [4]
FACSS Distinguished Service Award [5]
FACSS Innovation Award [6]
Charles Mann Award for Applied Raman Spectroscopy [7]
Anachem Award [8]
Lester W. Strock Award [9]
Applied Spectroscopy William F. Meggers Award [10]
Ellis R. Lippincott Award [11]
 William G. Fateley Student Award 
Coblentz Society Craver Award [12]
ACS Div of Analytical Chem Arthur F. Findeis Award for Achievements by a Young Analytical Scientist [13]

The FACSS Innovation Award was started in 2011 at the Reno meeting.

Sponsoring societies 
 American Chemical Society Analytical Division
 AES Electrophoresis Society
 American Society for Mass Spectrometry
 Anachem
 Coblentz Society
 Council for Near-Infrared Spectroscopy
 Infrared Raman and Discussion Group
 International Society of Automation Analysis Division
 The North American Society for Laser-Induced Breakdown Spectroscopy
 Royal Society of Chemistry Analytical Division
 Society for Applied Spectroscopy
 The Spectroscopical Society of Japan

Conferences 
 2015 (forthcoming) Providence, RI, September 27-October 2, 2015 
 2014 (forthcoming) Reno, NV, September 28-October 3, 2014 
 2013 (forthcoming) Milwaukee, WI, September 29-October 3, 2013, which will be the 40th annual meeting of the FACSS organization 
 2012 - Kansas City, MO
 2011 - Reno, NV
2010 - Raleigh, NC
2009 - Louisville, KY
2008 - Reno, NV
2007 - Memphis, TN
2006 - Lake Buena Vista, FL
2005 - Quebec City, Canada
2004 - Portland, OR
2003 - Ft. Lauderdale, FL
2002 - Providence, RI
2001 - Detroit, Michigan
2000 - Nashville, Tennessee
1999 - Vancouver, BC
1998 - Austin, TX
Accompanying each conference, attendees receive a final program book of abstracts which includes the schedule of talks, profiles of award winners, a list of exhibitors, and much more. Copies of these final programs for all forty of the conferences held by FACSS are available for download as .pdf files from the FACSS website, under Past Events.

References

External links 
 American Chemical Society- Analytical Division 
 AES Electrophoresis Society
 American Society for Mass Spectrometry
 Anachem
 Coblentz Society
 Council for Near-Infrared Spectroscopy
 Infrared Raman and Discussion Group
 International Society of Automation- Analysis Division
 The North American Society for Laser-Induced Breakdown Spectroscopy
 Royal Society of Chemistry - Analytical Division
 Society for Applied Spectroscopy
 The Spectroscopical Society of Japan

Scientific societies based in the United States
Annual events in the United States
Spectroscopy
Analytical chemistry